Tyrrheniellina josephi is a species of land snail, a terrestrial pulmonate gastropod mollusc in the family Canariellidae, the hairy snails and their allies. This species is endemic to Italy.

References

 Giusti, F. & Manganelli, G. (1989). Notulae Malacologicae, XLIV. A new Hygromiidae from the Tyrrhenian islands of Capraia and Sardinia with notes on the genera Xeromicra and Xerotricha (Pulmonata: Helicoidea) (Studies on the Sardinian and Corsican malacofauna, VIII). Bollettino Malacologico, 25 (1/4): 23-62. Milano
 Bank, R. A.; Neubert, E. (2017). Checklist of the land and freshwater Gastropoda of Europe. Last update: July 16th, 2017

External links
 AnimalBase info on this species
 Palazzi, S. & Ripken, T. 1996.  Tyrrheniella josephi.   2006 IUCN Red List of Threatened Species.   Downloaded on 7 August 2007.

Tyrrheniellina
Endemic fauna of Italy
Gastropods described in 1989
Taxonomy articles created by Polbot